Faceu is a heat beauty selfie camera app for smartphone. This app uses AR technology to allow users to choose their favorite stickers or add interesting and exaggerated effects in real-time when taking selfies and videos. It was launched in 2016 and had 250 million registered users in 2017. Most of the users of Faceu are females from 15 to 35 years old. In February 2018, Faceu was acquired by Chinese media startup Toutiao, which is worth about $300 million.

The app was banned in India (along with other Chinese apps) on 2 September 2020 by the government, the move came amid the 2020 China-India skirmish.

Online marketing 
There are many selfie camera apps in China such as MeituPic, Pitu and Camera360. Faceu decided to focus on the social function, it added IM block where users can add other users and have a funny video chat with their friends or strangers. The photos and short videos will be deleted in a short time after sharing to protect users' privacy, which can encourage users to use Faceu more freely. Faceu have cooperated with brands like CHANEL, Michael Kors and KFC to launch social media campaigns by designing specific stickers. In 2016, Faceu cooperated with Meipai which belongs to MeituPic, and launched a rainbow effect activity. As the main users group of Meipai is similar to Faceu, this activity had great success and Faceu ranked straightly to top one in the App Store list from around 80 within just 3 days. In October 2017, Faceu launched a special function during Mid-Autumn festival and National Day. When users upload their selfie onto the App, the photo will be changed into a painting with Chinese ancient costume or Chinese military uniform. Then many people posted their edited photos on WeChat and Weibo, which made it became a hotspot for a long time. Hence, more and more people download it to catch up the trend. Additionally, Faceu also cooperated with more than 50 celebrities on the social media, such as Papi jiang, Liu Yifei, Wu Chun and Sun Honglei to cover different kinds of customers. Celebrities will post selfies or short videos with the logo on social media or appear with the cute effects on the TV show.
Faceu's online marketing was a great success. The main reason is that the cost of users' participation is low, they just need to upload a selfie, and wait for a few seconds. Besides, they know what their customers want and choose the right time to launch the effective strategies. Lastly, Faceu group has elicited users emotional and resonance utilizing key opinion leaders (KOL) and acquaintances social.

Offline marketing 
On the first day of 2018, Faceu have cooperated with PUMA and Bobbi Brown and set up a fancy shop in Shanghai. This shop called 'U funny laboratory' have fashion and interesting decoration, which is an excellent place for the hot bloggers to take photos. Faceu have successfully discovered the interest of the young, utilized its own functions and connected the brand with fashion.

References

External links

Mobile applications
Digital marketing
Software companies of China
Internet properties established in 2016
Internet censorship in India